Latvia competed at the inaugural 1924 Winter Olympics in Chamonix, France.

Cross-country skiing

Men

Speed skating

Men

All-round 
Distances: 500m; 5000m; 1500m & 10,000m.

References

Olympic Winter Games 1924, full results by sports-reference.com

Nations at the 1924 Winter Olympics
1924
Olympics, Winter